John Francis Reed  (born November 12, 1949) is an American lawyer and politician serving as the senior United States senator from Rhode Island, a seat he was first elected to in 1996. Reed graduated from the United States Military Academy and Harvard University, serving in the U.S. Army as an active officer from 1971 to 1979. He is the dean of Rhode Island's congressional delegation.

Early life, education and career
Reed was born in Cranston, Rhode Island, the son of Mary Louise ( Monahan) and Joseph Anthony Reed. Reed graduated from La Salle Academy and the United States Military Academy at West Point, where he received a Bachelor of Science degree in 1971. After graduating, he spent several years in active duty military service. Reed earned the Ranger Tab and was a paratrooper. He served as a paratrooper in the 2nd Battalion, 504th Parachute Infantry Regiment, 82nd Airborne Division where he was a Platoon Leader, Company Commander and Battalion Staff Officer.

Reed attended the John F. Kennedy School of Government at Harvard University, where he received a Master of Public Policy. He returned to West Point in 1978 as an associate professor in the Department of Social Sciences. He left active duty in 1979 after earning the rank of captain. He served in the United States Army Reserve until 1991, and retired as a major. After leaving active duty, Reed enrolled in Harvard Law School, where he became a member of the Board of Student Advisers. In 1982, he graduated with his Juris Doctor and worked as an associate at the Washington, D.C. office of law firm of Sutherland Asbill & Brennan. Afterward, he returned to Rhode Island and worked for the Providence law firm Edwards and Angell until 1990.

Reed was elected as a state senator in 1984 and served three terms.

Reed married professional Senate staffer Julia Hart in a Roman Catholic ceremony in the Catholic chapel on the United States Military Academy campus on April 16, 2005. On January 5, 2007, their daughter, Emily, was born.

U.S. House of Representatives
In 1990, Reed was elected to the United States House of Representatives, receiving 59% of the vote in the general election. For the next six years, he focused on education and health care.

U.S. Senate

Elections

1996 

When Senator Claiborne Pell, the longest-serving senator in Rhode Island's history and the 13th longest-serving senator in US history, announced his retirement in 1996, Reed declared his candidacy. Reed won the Democratic primary with 86% of the vote and beat the Republican nominee, Rhode Island General Treasurer Nancy Mayer, 63% to 35%.

2002 

Reed ran for a second term. He was unopposed in the Democratic primary and his Republican opponent was Robert Tingle, a casino pit manager and the unsuccessful Republican nominee for the state's 2nd congressional district in 2000. Reed won by 78% to 22%.

2008 

Reed ran for a third term. He won the Democratic primary with 87% of the vote. In the general election, he faced a rematch with Tingle, again winning in a landslide, 73% to 27%.

2014 

Reed ran for a fourth term. Polling showed him leading prospective Republican opponents by margins of between 29% and 65%. Unopposed in the Democratic primary, Reed faced former Congressional nominee and former Rhode Island Republican Party Chairman Mark Zaccaria in the general election. Reed won in another landslide, 71% to 29%.

2020 

Reed ran for a fifth term. He won the Democratic primary unopposed. In the general election, he faced investment consultant Allen R. Waters and won in yet another landslide, 67% to 33%.

Political future
In 2008, Reed was mentioned as a potential vice presidential running mate for Barack Obama. On July 14, 2008, Reed announced that he was "not interested" in becoming Obama's running mate.

Reed has consistently been mentioned as a possible Secretary of Defense. In late 2010, he turned down Obama's offer to succeed Robert Gates as Secretary of Defense. The position was ultimately filled by Leon Panetta. After Obama was reelected in 2012 and Panetta announced his decision to retire, Reed was again mentioned as a possible nominee for the position, as well as for Director of the Central Intelligence Agency. Once again, he denied interest in either position.

When Panetta's successor Chuck Hagel announced his resignation in December 2014, Reed was again said to be on Obama's shortlist. Despite the Republican takeover of the Senate in the 2014 elections, it was said that Reed's confirmation would be a "foregone conclusion". He again denied interest, with a spokesman saying, "Senator Reed loves his job and wants to continue serving the people of Rhode Island in the United States Senate. He has made it very clear that he does not wish to be considered for Secretary of Defense or any other cabinet position. He just asked the people of Rhode Island to hire him for another six-year term and plans on honoring that commitment."

On November 24, 2014, Ted Nesi of WPRI-TV gave some reasons that Reed might be uninterested in cabinet positions, citing his "safe seat", his status as one of the most popular politicians in the state, his fondness for working in the Senate and his passion for housing policy. He concluded that "no matter how many times Reed's aides privately groan about another flareup of defense secretary speculation, they surely appreciate that each recurrence is a sign of the senator's positive reputation in Washington and Obama's esteem for him."

Committee assignments
Committee on Armed Services (Chairman)
Subcommittee on Emerging Threats and Capabilities
Subcommittee on Seapower
Subcommittee on Strategic Forces
Committee on Appropriations
Subcommittee on Commerce, Justice, Science, and Related Agencies
Subcommittee on Defense
Subcommittee on Interior, Environment, and Related Agencies 
Subcommittee on Labor, Health and Human Services, Education, and Related Agencies
Subcommittee on Military Construction, Veterans Affairs, and Related Agencies
Subcommittee on Transportation, Housing and Urban Development, and Related Agencies
Committee on Banking, Housing, and Urban Affairs
Subcommittee on Financial Institutions and Consumer Protection
Subcommittee on Housing, Transportation, and Community Development
Subcommittee on Securities, Insurance, and Investment
Select Committee on Intelligence (ex officio)

Caucus memberships
 Afterschool Caucuses

Legislation sponsored
The following is an incomplete list of legislation that Reed has sponsored:
 Affordable College Textbook Act (S. 1864; 115th Congress)

Political positions
Since his election to Congress, Reed has consistently voted in a similar manner to other New England Democrats, holding generally liberal positions on social and economic issues. He has voted with his party 94.7% of the time.

Abortion
Reed strongly supports abortion rights, and has rejected proposals to limit late-term abortion, ban such procedures from occurring on military installations, and deny minors the right to cross state lines to obtain abortions.

Civil rights
Reed supports affirmative action. He has voted to expand such policies and to set aside money for women and minorities from the highway fund. He also supported LGBTQ rights, voting against a proposed constitutional amendment to ban gay marriage and in favor of measures that prevent job discrimination and hate crimes against LGBTQ people.

Economy and jobs
Reed has generally supported fair trade policies over similar ones advocating free trade. He voted against renewing presidential authority to "fast-track" normalized trade relations. Reed opposed CAFTA and similar free trade proposals for Chile, Singapore, Peru, and Oman, but voted in favor of normalizing trade relations with China. He has also been a strong supporter of unionizing workers, and has criticized government and business interference with these groups. Reed supports increasing the minimum wage and unemployment compensation.

Reed serves on the Senate Banking Committee, which has held hearings into JP Morgan Chase bank's activities. He has accepted campaign contributions from its CEO Jamie Dimon.

Election security 
In July 2019, Reed and Minnesota Senator Amy Klobuchar sent a letter to Acting Homeland Security (DHS) Secretary Kevin McAleenan requesting an explanation of the actions the DHS took in response to "unexpected behavior" of voting equipment in Durham County, North Carolina during the 2016 presidential election and writing that it was "critical that we learn as much as we can about the extent of the attacks we faced in 2016, and that these lessons be shared as widely as possible so that our nation is fully prepared for the 2020 elections."

Energy
Reed supports limiting American oil use and expanding alternative energy. He opposes Arctic National Wildlife Refuge drilling and federal subsidies for oil exploration, while favoring a 40% reduction in oil use by 2025 and funding for hydrogen automobiles. Reed has voted to end discussions on Corporate Average Fuel Economy standards, and has been an outspoken proponent of stronger restrictions of mercury use, as well as an end to commercial whaling.

Gun laws
Reed has voted against limiting lawsuits on gun manufacturers and has favored expanding gun control. He voted against loosening background checks at gun shows.

Healthcare
Reed has been an advocate of preventive healthcare. Like many other Democrats, he supports increasing Medicare funding, enrolling more Americans into programs that help the uninsured, allowing prescription drugs to be imported from Canada, and negotiating bulk medication purchases for Medicare in order to lower costs. Reed does not support Medicare for All. Instead, in 2019 he proposed the Choose Medicare Act, which he claims increases "access, competition, and choice."

Immigration
Although he voted for the 1996 Immigration Reform Bill, Reed has generally supported allowing undocumented immigrants and foreign workers to enter the path to citizenship. He supports Guest Worker programs and giving immigrants access to Social Security. He opposed establishing English as the nation's official language and has been critical of the effort to fence the US-Mexican border. He is the author of the Reed Amendment, which permits former U.S. citizens to be denied entry to the country if they are believed to have renounced their citizenship for tax reasons. On February 23, 2010, Reed co-sponsored the DREAM Act, a piece of legislation that would allow undocumented students living in the United States from a very young age to gain legal status.

When asked about voting against Social Security benefits going to illegal immigrants, Reed said that he supported this interim measure and "any such agreement must be fully examined so that it does not adversely impact benefits earned by American citizens."

LGBTQIA+ rights 
In October 2018, Reed was one of 20 senators to sign a letter to Secretary of State Mike Pompeo urging him to reverse the rollback of a policy that granted visas to same-sex partners of LGBTQ diplomats who had unions that were not recognized by their home countries, writing that too many places around the world have seen LGBTQIA+ individuals "subjected to discrimination and unspeakable violence, and receive little or no protection from the law or local authorities", and that the US refusing to let LGBTQIA+ diplomats bring their partners to the US would be tantamount to upholding "the discriminatory policies of many countries around the world."

Veteran affairs
Reed helps veterans enter the Department of Veteran Affairs, ensuring that former servicemen and servicewomen can receive medical care.

War in Iraq
Reed was one of 23 US senators to vote against H.J. Resolution 114, which authorized President George W. Bush to use force against Iraq in 2002. In 2007, he elaborated on his sentiments, saying, "It was a flawed strategy that diverted attention and resources away from hunting down Osama bin Laden's terrorist network." Like David Petraeus, Reed said he believed the real problems in Iraq were political and unrelated to the military.

War in Yemen
In 2018, Reed was one a few Democrats to support U.S. backing of the Saudi-led coalition fighting in Yemen. By 2019 he reversed his position, saying that he wanted to end U.S. support for the coalition. A network of progressive groups, including Demand Progress, Working Families Party, and Chapo Trap House, urged Reed to ensure that the 2020 National Defense Authorization Act withdrew support for the war.

Nagorno–Karabakh conflict
On October 1, 2020, Reed co-signed a letter to Secretary of State Mike Pompeo that condemned Azerbaijan’s offensive operations against the Republic of Artsakh, denounced Turkey’s role in the Nagorno-Karabakh conflict and called for an immediate ceasefire. Reed stated that "Armenians have a right to defend themselves when attacked."

War in Afghanistan
Reed supports President Joe Biden's decision to withdraw all U.S. troops from Afghanistan by September 2021. He said that "the president made a difficult, but the best of many poor choices."

Electoral history

United States House of Representatives 2nd district Democratic primary election in Rhode Island, 1990
 √ Jack Reed 49.0%
 Edward Beard, Sr. 27.4%
 Charles Gifford, III 14.7%
 Rodney Driver 8.9%

United States House of Representatives 2nd district election in Rhode Island, 1990
 √ Jack Reed (D) 59.2%
 Gertrude Coxe (R) 40.8%

United States House of Representatives 2nd district Democratic primary election in Rhode Island, 1992
 √ Jack Reed (Incumbent) 76.4%
 Spencer Dickinson 23.6%

United States House of Representatives 2nd district election in Rhode Island, 1992
 √ Jack Reed (D) (Incumbent) 70.7%
 James Bell (R) 24.5%
 Thomas Ricci (I) 3.3%
 John Turnbull (IT) 1.6%

United States House of Representative 2nd district election in Rhode Island, 1994
 √ Jack Reed (D) (Incumbent) 68.0%
 John Elliot (R) 32.0%

United States Senate Democratic primary election in Rhode Island, 1996
 √ Jack Reed 86.1%
 Don Gil 13.9%

United States Senate election in Rhode Island, 1996
 √ Jack Reed (D) 63.3%
 Nancy Mayer (R) 35.0%
 Donald W. Lovejoy (I) 1.7%

United States Senate election in Rhode Island, 2002
 √ Jack Reed (D) (Incumbent) 78.4%
 Robert G. Tingle (R) 21.6%

United States Senate Democratic primary election in Rhode Island, 2008
 √ Jack Reed 86.8%
 Christopher Young 13.2%

United States Senate election in Rhode Island, 2008
 √ Jack Reed (D) (Incumbent) 73.4%
 Robert G. Tingle (R) 27.6%

United States Senate election in Rhode Island, 2014
 √ Jack Reed (D) (Incumbent) 71%
 Mark Zaccaria (R) 29%

United States Senate election in Rhode Island, 2020
 √ Jack Reed (D) (Incumbent) 66.5%
 Allen Waters (R) 33.4%

Honors
 Grand-Officer of the Order of Prince Henry, Portugal (June 1, 1998)

References

Further reading

External links

Senator Jack Reed official U.S. Senate website
Campaign website

Articles
War Puts Military Veteran Candidates in the Spotlight Greg Giroux, CQ Politics, February. 10, 2006
Mulligan, John E. "Soldiering On", Washingtonian, September 1, 2008

|-

|-

|-

|-

|-

|-

1949 births
21st-century American politicians
Democratic Party members of the United States House of Representatives from Rhode Island
Democratic Party United States senators from Rhode Island
Harvard Law School alumni
Harvard Kennedy School alumni
La Salle Academy alumni
Lawyers from Washington, D.C.
Living people
Politicians from Cranston, Rhode Island
Democratic Party Rhode Island state senators
United States Army officers
United States Military Academy alumni
American people of Portuguese descent